Summer Worden (born 1975) is a former intelligence officer for the United States Air Force and Intelligence Community. She is the founder of a technology and security service company, Filly Intelligence LLC. Worden became the first person to file an accusation of a crime committed in outer space when she accused her then-estranged wife NASA astronaut Anne McClain of wrongfully accessing their bank accounts. However, those accusations were subsequently shown to be false and Worden was indicted by a Grand Jury in March 2020 on two counts of lying to federal investigators. Her trial is in spring of 2022, and she faces up to 10 years in prison.

Education 
Worden was born in Kansas. She attended Canton Galva High School and University of Texas at San Antonio. She earned a business degree and aerospace minor; she was in the Air Force ROTC program.

Worden is a graduate of Rice University, where she earned her MBA. She is an alumnus of the NSA Cryptologic School, and has advanced degrees in Strategic Intelligence and Digital Forensics.

Career 
Worden worked for 13 years in the US Air Force and Intelligence Community. She also led a team for the National Security Administration. She has served in special access programs relating to nuclear security. Worden also worked as the Director of Risk and AML at USAA Financial.

She founded Filly Intelligence in 2012, a woman-owned, and service-disabled veteran-owned small business.

Personal life 
Worden was married to NASA astronaut Anne McClain from 2014 until 2019. The couple separated in 2018, after Worden was arrested for Family Violence with Injury on McClain; the charges were dismissed at McClain's request prior to her December 2018 space flight.

In 2019 Worden accused McClain of inappropriately accessing bank accounts from outer space. This claim was the first public allegation of a crime committed outside of planet Earth. Worden was later charged with two counts of making false claims to federal authorities, and McClain was cleared.

Worden has a son, Briggs. She conceived the boy through in vitro fertilization and carried by a surrogate. Worden and McClain shared custody of the child until their divorce.

References 

1975 births
Living people
Women in the United States Air Force
American women aviators
American engineers
American women computer scientists
American computer scientists
National Security Agency people
American LGBT scientists
21st-century American women